The following is a complete list of Home video releases for the Syfy television series Eureka. All five seasons have been released on DVD in Region 1, seasons 1–4.5 have been released in region 2 and seasons 1–4 have been released in region 4, season 3 and 4 were released in two separate sets for each season in region 1 and 2.

Box sets

DVD

Compilations

DVD 
In Australia, Region 4, A complete collection DVD has been released and distributed by Shock titled 'Eureka: Complete Collection (Seasons One-Five) on August 7, 2019.

Blu-ray
In the US, Mill Creek Entertainment originally scheduled the complete Blu-ray set to be released on June 9, 2020, until it was moved to August 11.

References

External links 
 

Home video releases
Eureka